José Martínez (born 7 July 1952) is a Cuban former swimmer. He competed in four events at the 1968 Summer Olympics.

References

1952 births
Living people
Cuban male swimmers
Olympic swimmers of Cuba
Swimmers at the 1968 Summer Olympics
Sportspeople from Camagüey